Kišava, is a village in the municipality of Bitola, North Macedonia. It used to be part of the former municipality of Bistrica.

Demographics and History
Kišava is populated by Muslim Albanians. From the 1950s onward, people from Kišava began migrating to nearby settlements like Medžitlija or going abroad to other countries for better opportunities. 

As of the 2021 census, Kišava had 185 residents with the following ethnic composition:
Albanians 169
Persons for whom data are taken from administrative sources 16

According to the 2002 census, the village had a total of 308 inhabitants. Ethnic groups in the village include:
Albanians 307
Macedonians 1

From 1963 onward, Albanians from Kišava migrated to Dandenong, a south-eastern Melbourne suburb in Victoria, Australia. Dandenong is home to a large diaspora from Kišava and various landmarks are named after the village like Dandenong's Albanian mosque, Keshava Reserve, a park honouring Albanian immigration to the area and Keshava Grove, a residential street.

In 2020, some members of the Kišava diaspora from Dandenong organised an ongoing annual festival Takimet e Keshavës (Kišava gathering) in Kišava, and is attended by the diaspora during their summer holidays in the village.

Gallery

References

External links

Villages in Bitola Municipality
Albanian communities in North Macedonia